The PEN Pinter Prize and the Pinter International Writer of Courage Award both comprise an annual literary award launched in 2009 by English PEN in honour of the late Nobel Literature Prize-winning playwright Harold Pinter, who had been a Vice President of English PEN and an active member of the International PEN Writers in Prison Committee (WiPC). The award is given to "a British writer or a writer resident in Britain of outstanding literary merit who, in the words of Pinter’s Nobel speech ['Art, Truth and Politics'], casts an 'unflinching, unswerving' gaze upon the world and shows 'a fierce, intellectual determination … to define the real truth of our lives and our societies'." The Prize is shared with an "International Writer of Courage," defined as "someone who has been persecuted for speaking out about [his or her] beliefs," selected by English PEN's Writers at Risk Committee in consultation with the annual Prize winner, and announced during an award ceremony held at the British Library, on or around 10 October, the anniversary of Pinter's birth.

The PEN Pinter Prize is one of the many PEN literary awards sponsored by PEN International affiliates in "more than 100" PEN International Centers located around the world.

Recipients

2009
 PEN Pinter Prize: Tony Harrison, poet and playwright
 International Writer of Courage Award: Zarganar (Maung Thura), Burmese artist

2010
 PEN Pinter Prize: Hanif Kureishi
 International Writer of Courage Award: Lydia Cacho, Mexican journalist and human rights activist

2011
PEN Pinter Prize: David Hare, playwright
International Writer of Courage Award: Roberto Saviano, Italian writer and journalist

2012
PEN Pinter Prize: Carol Ann Duffy, poet
International Writer of Courage Award: Samar Yazbek, Syrian writer

2013
PEN Pinter Prize: Tom Stoppard, playwright
International Writer of Courage Award: Iryna Khalip, Belarusian journalist

2014
PEN Pinter Prize: Salman Rushdie, novelist
International Writer of Courage Award: Mazen Darwish, Syrian lawyer and journalist

2015
PEN Pinter Prize: James Fenton
International Writer of Courage Award: Raif Badawi, Saudi activist

2016
PEN Pinter Prize: Margaret Atwood
International Writer of Courage Award: Ahmedur Rashid Chowdhury, Bangladeshi publisher

2017
PEN Pinter Prize: Michael Longley
International Writer of Courage Award: Mahvash Sabet, Iranian poet and teacher

2018
PEN Pinter Prize: Chimamanda Ngozi Adichie
International Writer of Courage: Waleed Abulkhair, Saudi lawyer and human rights activist

2019
PEN Pinter Prize: Lemn Sissay
International Writer of Courage Award: Befeqadu Hailu, Ethiopian writer and blogger

2020 

 PEN Pinter Prize: Linton Kwesi Johnson
 International Writer of Courage Award: Amanuel Asrat, Eritrean poet

2021 

 PEN Pinter Prize: Tsitsi Dangarembga
 International Writer of Courage Award: Kakwenza Rukirabashaija, Ugandan novelist

2022 
 PEN Pinter Prize: Malorie Blackman
 International Writer of Courage Award: Abduljalil al-Singace

See also
Prison literature

References

External links
PEN Pinter Prize − English PEN official webpage

Awards established in 2009
2009 establishments in England
English PEN awards
Literary awards honouring human rights